Angonyx papuana is a moth of the  family Sphingidae.

Distribution 
It is known from Papua New Guinea, northern Queensland and the Bismarck Archipelago.

Description 
The wingspan is about 50 mm. Adults have forewings that are brown with pale tips, each having a pale band across the middle. They have darker brown hind wings.

Subspecies
Angonyx papuana papuana
Angonyx papuana bismarcki P.B. Clark, 1929 (New Ireland, Bismarck Archipelago)

References

Angonyx
Moths described in 1903
Moths of New Guinea
Moths of Australia